The 2018–19 VfL Wolfsburg season was the 74th season in the football club's history and 22nd consecutive and overall season in the top flight of German football, the Bundesliga, having been promoted from the 2. Bundesliga in 1997. In addition to the domestic league, VfL Wolfsburg also participated in the season's edition of the domestic cup, the DFB-Pokal. This was the 17th season for Wolfsburg in the Volkswagen Arena, located in Wolfsburg, Lower Saxony, Germany. The season covers a period from 1 July 2018 to 30 June 2019.

Players

Squad information

Transfers

Transfers in

Loans in

Transfers out

Loans out

Friendly matches

Competitions

Overview

Bundesliga

League table

Results summary

Results by round

Matches

DFB-Pokal

Statistics

Appearances and goals

|-
! colspan=14 style=background:#dcdcdc; text-align:center| Goalkeepers

|-
! colspan=14 style=background:#dcdcdc; text-align:center| Defenders

|-
! colspan=14 style=background:#dcdcdc; text-align:center| Midfielders

|-
! colspan=14 style=background:#dcdcdc; text-align:center| Forwards

|-
! colspan=14 style=background:#dcdcdc; text-align:center| Players transferred out during the season

|-

References

VfL Wolfsburg seasons
Wolfsburg